Anderson Soares da Silva, known by his nickname, Neneca (born 11 September 1980), is a Brazilian football goalkeeper who plays for Santo André.

Honours
Botafogo-SP
Campeonato Brasileiro Série D: 2015

References

1980 births
Living people
Brazilian footballers
Association football goalkeepers
Campeonato Brasileiro Série A players
União São João Esporte Clube players
Nacional Atlético Clube (SP) players
União Agrícola Barbarense Futebol Clube players
Esporte Clube Santo André players
América Futebol Clube (MG) players
Figueirense FC players
Guarani FC players
Botafogo Futebol Clube (SP) players
Expatriate footballers in Poland
People from Rondonópolis
Sportspeople from Mato Grosso